Saxton can refer to:

Places

United States
 Saxton, Kentucky, USA
 Saxton, Missouri, USA
 Saxton, Pennsylvania, USA
 Saxton Nuclear Generating Station
 Camp Saxton Site, Port Royal, South Carolina, USA

Other places
 Saxton, North Yorkshire, England, UK
 Saxton, New Zealand, a suburb of Nelson
 Saxton Oval, a cricket ground
 Saxton River, a river in Marlborough Region, South island, New Zealand
 Saxton Ridge, Antarctica

People

Surname
 Alexander Saxton (1919–2012), American historian and novelist
 Christopher Saxton (c. 1540–c. 1610), English cartographer
 Jad Saxton (born 1979), American voice actress
 Jim Saxton (born 1943), congressman from New Jersey
 Joseph Saxton (1799–1873), American inventor
 Robert Saxton (born 1953), British composer
 Ron Saxton (born 1954), Oregon politician 
 Rufus Saxton, (1824–1908) American general
 Tommy Saxton (born 1983), English rugby league footballer

Titles
Saxton baronets, a title in the baronetage of Great Britain

Other uses
 The Saxton Group, a U.S. restaurant franchisee
 Saxton Hale, a character in the video game Team Fortress 2

See also
 
 
 Saxtons River, a river in Vermont, United States
 Saxtons River, Vermont, USA, a village